Osymyso (real name Mark Nicholson) is a musician and DJ from the United Kingdom who specialises in the genres of mashup / bastard pop and breakbeat. He has been making music since 1994 and released his first album, Welcome to the Pailindrome, in 1999. Songs which he has created include "Pat n Peg", which turns an argument between two EastEnders characters into a track through the looping of the shouts You bitch! and You cow! and the addition of a hip hop beat, and "Intro-Inspection". In a 2002 front page survey of the genre, The New York Times remarked on "Intro-Inspection" and called Osymyso "one of the most popular bootleg artists".

Career
Osymyso uses Cubase and WaveLab on a PC to make music. In interviews, Osymyso has indicated that it takes him a week to make a track that contains no samples, but that he can compose a bootleg track in a matter of hours.

In 2005, Osymyso set himself the task of releasing one short track every week for 50 weeks, a project he called 05ymy50. However, progress was slower than hoped, and by year's end only 15 tracks had been completed. Despite this, Osymyso felt the project was at least a partial success: some of the tracks have been released on vinyl by Juno Records, and Osymyso has indicated that he may eventually finish the project.

He provided a track called "Spaced Jam" for the 2004 reissue of the complete Spaced TV series with Simon Pegg and Edgar Wright, which samples dialogue from the show over a dance beat. He also produced the soundtrack album for the pair's 2004 film Shaun of the Dead, and was responsible for a track on the 2007 soundtrack to Hot Fuzz. Osymyso also provided seven "trailer remixes" for Edgar Wright's movie Scott Pilgrim vs. the World. Pegg also contributed percussion parts for the 05ymy50 project.

Osymyso has remixed Chris Morris' George W. Bush cut-up "Bushwacked 2" and Morris' short film My Wrongs 8245-8249 and 117, which is available on the DVD release.

He most notably created a "Birthday Mix" of Placebo's hit "Twenty Years" appears on the CD format of the single. 2009 saw Osymyso produce a 60-minute remix for Warp Records for their 20th Anniversary box set.

Osymyso produced a mix for the Mary Ann Hobbs' The Breezeblock BBC Radio One show.

"Intro-Inspection"
"Intro-Inspection" is a bastard pop song by Osymyso. It sets itself apart from other songs of its genre by putting together the intros to one hundred different, well-known songs—all by different artists—into a twelve-minute long song.

"Intro-Inspection" was never officially released, although there was a very limited number of CDs and vinyl copies printed. It therefore never entered any official chart.

List of samples used for Intro-Inspection

Sources
 Neil Strauss, "Spreading by the Web, Pop's Bootleg Remix", New York Times, 9 May 2002, Pg. A1.

References

External links
 
 An interview with Osymyso at b3ta
 Profile at Discogs
 Interview with Osymyso about Intro-Inspection

Living people
British DJs
Year of birth missing (living people)